Black Orchid is an album by jazz group The Three Sounds featuring performances recorded in 1962 and released on the Blue Note label. The 1998 limited CD reissue features another seven unissued tracks recorded at different sessions. It was also issued in Japan in 2015, on SHM-CD, featuring different bonus tracks recorded at the same sessions.

Reception
The Allmusic review by Stephen Thomas Erlewine awarded the album 4 stars, stating "It displays their knack for deftly swinging uptempo numbers, light blues and sensitive standards. If anything, it swings a little harder and is a little more soulful than some of its predecessors".

Track listing
All compositions by Gene Harris except as noted
 "Black Orchid" (Cal Tjader) - Erroneously credited to (Neal Hefti) - 5:25
 "A Foggy Day" (Gershwin, Gershwin) -  6:46
 "For All We Know" (Coots, Lewis) - 5:31
 "Oh Well, Oh Well" - 3:45
 "At Last" (Gordon, Warren) - 5:37
 "Secret Love" (Sammy Fain, Paul Francis Webster) - 5:44
 "Don't Go, Don't Go" - 5:08
 "Saucer Eyes" (Weston) - 4:41

Bonus tracks on 1998 CD reissue:
"You Dig It" - 5:41
 "Nature Boy" (eden ahbez) - 4:11
 "Theme From M Squad" (Count Basie) - erroneously credited to (Carter) - 4:15
 "Azule Serape" (Feldman) - 4:22
 "For Dancers Only" (Oliver, Raye, Schoen) - 3:52
 "Back Home" - 3:27
 "Tadd's Delight" (Dameron) - 5:37

2015 SHM-CD reissue
 "Black Orchid" (Cal Tjader) - Erroneously credited to (Neil Hefti) - 5:24
 "A Foggy Day" (Gershwin, Gershwin) -  6:44
 "For All We Know" (Coots, Lewis) - 5:29
 "Oh Well, Oh Well" - 3:43
 "At Last" (Gordon, Warren) - 5:34
 "Secret Love" (Fain) - 5:42
 "Don't Go, Don't Go" - 5:05
 "Saucer Eyes" (Weston) - 4:40

Bonus tracks
"Babe's Blues" (Randy Weston) - 4:37
 "Over the Rainbow" (Harburg, Arlen) - 4:55
 "Tadd's Delight" (Dameron) - 5:40
 "Azule Serape" (Feldman) - 4:20
 "For Dancers Only" (Oliver, Raye, Schoen) - 3:51
 "Nature Boy" (Ahbez) - 4:09

Personnel
Gene Harris - piano
Andrew Simpkins - bass
Bill Dowdy - drums

References

Blue Note Records albums
The Three Sounds albums
1964 albums
Albums produced by Alfred Lion
Albums recorded at Van Gelder Studio